Digne Cathedral is a Roman Catholic church located in the town of Digne-les-Bains, France. The cathedral has been a monument historique since 1906. It is the seat of the Bishops of Digne, Riez and Sisteron, formerly Bishops of Digne.

Construction began in 1490 by the order of the then bishop Antoine de Guiramand to cater for the movement of the town's population to a higher, more secure and defensible location round the local castle. The cathedral was renovated and expanded in the 1860s under the direction of architect Antoine-Nicolas Bailly.

The previous cathedral in the old town, Notre-Dame-du-Bourg (Cathédrale Notre-Dame-du-Bourg de Digne), a late Romanesque building of the 13th century, still stands as a museum.

References

External links

 Location of cathedral
  Diocese of Digne official website: Former cathedrals of the diocese 
 Digne Tourist Office website

Roman Catholic cathedrals in France
Churches in Alpes-de-Haute-Provence
Digne-les-Bains